North Gaulton Castle is a sea stack off the western coast off the Orkney main island.  It is formed from the red sandstone of the area and is about 165 feet high.  It was climbed in 2017 by four climbers using a Tyrolean traverse.

References

Climbing areas of Scotland
Landforms of Orkney
Stacks of Scotland
Tourist attractions in Orkney